

Results - Elite

Results - U23

Results - Junior

See also
UCI Mountain Bike & Trials World Championships

References

[] Official results

Cross country women
UCI